Durg City is one of the 90 Legislative Assembly constituencies of Chhattisgarh state in India. It is in Durg district.

Members of Legislative Assembly

Election results

2018

See also
List of constituencies of the Chhattisgarh Legislative Assembly
Durg district
 Durg

References

Durg district
Assembly constituencies of Chhattisgarh